The Nikon D70 is a digital single-lens reflex camera, introduced at the 2004 PMA Annual Convention and Trade Show, as Nikon's first consumer-level digital SLR, and a competitor to the Canon EOS 300D. It was often sold in a "kit package" with the Nikon 18-70mm AF-S lens. The Nikon D70 was succeeded initially by the Nikon D70s and eventually by the Nikon D80 and Nikon D90, announced on August 9, 2006 and August 27, 2008 respectively. The Nikon D70 is the first DSLR camera built by Nikon's factory in Thailand.  It debuted at a price of US$999.

Features 
The D70 features include:
Nikon DX format sensor 
1.5x field of view crop
6.1 megapixel sensor  (23.7 mm × 15.6 mm)
 1/500th second x-sync
Nikon F-mount lenses
File formats include JPEG, NEF (Nikon's raw image format), and JPEG+NEF
Single Servo and Continuous Servo focus modes
Continuous shooting at 3 frame/s up to 144 images using a high-speed storage card (minimum burst of 4 images with a low-speed storage card)
ISO 200–1600 (in full stops or 1/3 stops selectable)
 Configurable Auto-ISO (Automatic sensitivity change to keep required Shutter and/or Aperture values)
 New TTL Flash System

Due to its hybrid electronic/mechanical shutter, it is possible to flash synchronize the D70 and D70s beyond their published 1/500 maximum synchronization speed up to the maximum shutter speed of 1/8000.

The Nikon D70 has been considered superior to its predecessor, the D100, despite the higher price of the latter. The D70 is backward compatible with most of the older Nikkor lenses. Sigma, Tokina and Tamron are other popular lens suppliers of Nikon F-mount lenses.

D70s 
In early 2005 Nikon announced the D70s. The D70s is essentially an update of the D70, adding a larger LCD screen ( instead of ), though still having 130,000 pixels. The D70s also comes with the newer EN-EL3a battery with slightly higher capacity. While the battery performance is increased, the new version of the D70 lacks the previously included MS-D70 battery holder, which allowed users to mount three CR2 batteries in the camera in case of a dead battery (notably the adapter is not compatible with CR123 batteries). The camera is also equipped with a terminal for a proprietary remote release cable (MC-DC1).

In addition, the D70s features an increased 18 mm angle of coverage from its built-in flash; the flash on the D70 could only be used with lenses as wide as 20 mm.  All other updates to the D70s are available for the D70 through a firmware update, which include improved auto-focus performance, updated menu design and updated in-camera printer support.

The Canon EOS 350D (known as the Digital Rebel XT in the US) was its then-competitor when the D70s was introduced.

See also
Nikon EXPEED

References 

Nikon announces development of D70 digital SLR camera. 2003. Retrieved January 11, 2004.

External links 

 Nikon D70, from the Nikon Digital Archives
 Nikon D70s, from the Nikon Digital Archives
 Digital Photography Review: Nikon D70 Digital Camera Specifications
 Nikon D70 Operation Manual
 Nikon D70s Operation Manual

D70
D70
Cameras introduced in 2004